Gotham, also known as The Dead Can't Lie, is a 1988 American made-for-television thriller film written and directed by Lloyd Fonvielle and starring Tommy Lee Jones and Virginia Madsen. The film was originally created for Showtime.

Plot 
Down-and-out New York detective Eddie Mallard (Jones) finds himself involved in the weirdest case of his career when a wealthy man asks for his help in stopping his ex-wife (Madsen) from harassing him. Mallard finds that the case may be too much for him when he discovers that the woman died ten years ago – and that he is falling in love with her.

Cast 
 Tommy Lee Jones as Eddie Mallard
 Virginia Madsen as Rachel Carlyle
 Colin Bruce as Charlie Rand
 Denise Stephenson as Debbie
 Kevin Jarre as Tim
 Frederic Forrest as Father George
 J. B. White as Jimbo

Release 
Gotham premiered on Showtime on August 21, 1988.

Reception 
A reviewer for The Tampa Tribune criticized the film as "flat and dull".

References

External links 
 
 

1988 films
1988 thriller films
Golan-Globus films
Films scored by George S. Clinton